Acontias cregoi, commonly known as Cregoe's legless skink, Cregoi's blind legless skink, and Cregoi's legless skink, is a species of lizard in the family Scincidae. The species is endemic to South Africa.

Etymology
The specific name, cregoi, is in honor of John P. Cregoe who presented the holotype to the British Museum.

Habitat

Description
The holotype of A. cregoi has a total length of 15 cm (6 inches), which includes a tail 2.5 cm (1 inch) long.

Reproduction
A. cregoi is viviparous.

References

Further reading
Boulenger GA (1903). "Descriptions of new Lizards in the Collection of the British Museum". Annals and Magazine of Natural History, Seventh Series 12: 429–435. (Typhlosaurus cregoi, new species, pp. 434–435).

Acontias
Skinks of Africa
Endemic reptiles of South Africa
Reptiles described in 1903
Taxa named by George Albert Boulenger